A Goofy Movie is a 1995 American animated musical comedy-adventure film produced by Disney MovieToons and Walt Disney Television Animation. Directed by Kevin Lima, the film is based on The Disney Afternoon television series Goof Troop created by Robert Taylor and Michael Peraza Jr., and serves as a standalone follow-up to the show. It features the voices of Bill Farmer, Jason Marsden, Jim Cummings, Kellie Martin, Rob Paulsen, Pauly Shore, Jenna von Oÿ, and Wallace Shawn. Taking place three years after the events of Goof Troop, the film follows Goofy and his son, Max, who is now in high school, and revolves around the father-son relationship between the two as Goofy embarks on a misguided mission to bond with his son by taking him on a cross-country fishing trip.

Disney came up with the idea to make a theatrical animated film starring Goofy while considering ideas for a potential Goof Troop TV special. Lima wanted to expand out Goofy as a character and "give him an emotional side" that would resonate with audiences. Most of the cast from the show, including Farmer, Paulsen, and Cummings, reprised their roles while Dana Hill was replaced by Marsden as Max's voice due to the character's age difference. Furthermore, R&B artist Tevin Campbell provided the vocals for Powerline, a fictional celebrity musician who prominently appears in the film, performing the songs "Stand Out" and "I 2 I".

A Goofy Movie was released theatrically in the United States and Canada on April 7, 1995, by Walt Disney Pictures. Because the film had been greenlighted by the recently fired Jeffrey Katzenberg, the film's release was deemed by Disney to be merely a contractual obligation. Its initial release made a meager impression at the box office, grossing $37.6 million against an $18 million production cost, and received mixed reviews from critics. However, with its home media release, the film garnered a cult following and since 2015 it has become a more prominent property within Disney. A direct-to-video sequel to the film titled An Extremely Goofy Movie was released on February 29, 2000.

Plot

Goofy is the single father of his 14-year-old son Max Goof, with whom he has a tense relationship due to Max's fears of turning into his father. On the last day of school before summer vacation, Max and his best friends P.J. and Robert "Bobby" Zimuruski hijack the auditorium in the middle of Principal Mazur's speech, creating a small concert where Max performs, while dressed as the pop singer Powerline. The performance succeeds in making Max a school celebrity and impressing his love interest, Roxanne, but he, P.J., and Bobby are sent to Mazur's office. While waiting outside of the office, Roxanne speaks with Max and accepts his offer to go with him to her best friend Stacey's party where Powerline's concert will be viewed live on Pay-per-view. However, Mazur warns Goofy that Max's behavior may result in him facing capital punishment.

Oblivious to Max's plans with Roxanne and fearing for his son's future, Goofy decides to take Max on a fishing trip from their home state of Ohio to Lake Destiny, Idaho, following a cross-country map route he and his father took years ago in the 1960s. Before they leave town, Max manages to stop by Roxanne's house to call off their date, but when the heartbroken Roxanne mentions going with someone else, Max panics and instead fabricates a story about his father knowing Powerline, telling her he will be on stage at the concert.

Despite his son's objections, Goofy plans his own trip, with initially disastrous results. Max angrily hurts his father's feelings after Goofy inadvertently humiliates Max at an opossum-based theme park. Later, Pete and P.J. happen to meet up with them while camping by a lake. While P.J. informs Max of how all their peers back home anticipate seeing him onstage at the Powerline concert, Pete urges Goofy to keep Max under control. Goofy takes his son fishing and shows him the Perfect Cast fishing technique, accidentally luring Bigfoot to their camp. Pete and P.J. escape, forcing Goofy and Max to spend the night with Bigfoot. That night, while Goofy sleeps, Max alters the map's route to Los Angeles, where the concert is taking place.

The next morning, Goofy decides to make Max the navigator of the trip. The two go to different locations that satisfy both of them. Eventually, they stop by a motel where they meet Pete and P.J. again. When Pete overhears a conversation between the boys, he tells Goofy that Max has tricked him into traveling to Los Angeles. The next day, Goofy and Max come to a junction: one leading to Idaho, the other to California. Max chooses the route to California, making a frustrated Goofy stop the car at the Grand Canyon and storm off. With the brake loose, the car drives off on its own; Goofy and Max chase after it and end up in the Colorado River. After a heated argument, Goofy says no matter how old Max gets he will always be his son, and the two finally reconcile with each other. After learning of Max's promise to Roxanne, Goofy decides to take him to the concert in Los Angeles. The two nearly plummet to their deaths down a waterfall, but Max saves Goofy using the Perfect Cast technique.

Goofy and Max arrive at the concert, and while attempting to sneak backstage, they end up onstage and dance with Powerline, watched by Pete, P.J. and Roxanne on separate televisions. Meanwhile, Bobby falls in love with Roxanne's best friend Stacey. Goofy and Max later return to Roxanne's house in their damaged car. Max tells the truth to Roxanne, though she accepts it and admits she always had feelings for him, ever since the first time she ever heard him utter his father's trademark laugh; thus, a relationship starts between them. Goofy's car suddenly explodes because of the damage it had sustained, ejecting Goofy in the process, who then falls through the porch roof of Roxanne's house, and Max introduces him to Roxanne.

Voice cast

 Jason Marsden as Maximilian "Max" Goof, Goofy's troubled teenage son.  
Aaron Lohr provides Max's singing voice.
 Bill Farmer as Goofy, a hard-working, clumsy single father who is a photographer at a photo studio in a mall department store.
 Rob Paulsen as P.J., Pete's son and Max's best friend.
 Jim Cummings as Pete, Goofy's colleague whom he and Max encounter during their road trip.
 Kellie Martin as Roxanne, Max's kind-hearted high school crush.
 Pauly Shore (uncredited) as Robert "Bobby" Zimuruski, Max and P.J.'s close friend from school and the film's main comic relief character. He has a minor role in the movie, but, due to a lot of fans loving him, becomes a major character in its sequel.
 Wallace Shawn as Principal Mazur, the strict principal of Max's school who kick-starts the film's main plot.
 Frank Welker as Bigfoot, a cryptid who lives in the forest.
 Jenna von Oÿ as Stacey, Roxanne's best friend and student body president.
 Tevin Campbell (uncredited) as Powerline, a famous pop star celebrity admired by Max and his peers.

Along with the main and supporting cast, Kevin Lima portrayed Lester the Possum, a walk-around character at Lester's Possum Park, and also voiced Roxanne's father. While Florence Stanley had a voice role as a waitress, Jo Anne Worley portrayed Miss Maples, Principal Mazur's upbeat secretary, and Joey Lawrence voiced a small character named Chad. Julie Brown and Pat Buttram (in his final film; he died before the film's release) both made appearances respectively as Lisa and the emcee at Lester's Possum Park. Dante Basco voiced one line as the Trekkie nerd who hits on Stacey during her announcement. Furthermore, Wayne Allwine lent his voice as Mickey Mouse in a cameo appearance in "On the Open Road" where he is seen hitchhiking alongside Donald Duck during Goofy and Max's road trip. Pat Carroll and Corey Burton voice the big woman and her small husband.

Production
A Goofy Movie is based on Goof Troop, an animated Disney Afternoon show created by Robert Taylor and Michael Peraza Jr., that centered around Goofy and his son, Max. When considering ideas for a TV special, Disney decided to produce a theatrical film based on the show, contracting Jymn Magon to write a feature-length script starring Goofy. The filmmakers chose to age up Max, who was shown as a young child in Goof Troop, setting the film several years later and putting him in high school. The movie was the feature film directorial debut for Disney story artist and animator Kevin Lima, who went on to direct the Disney films Tarzan (1999), 102 Dalmatians (2000) and Enchanted (2007). In 1995, Lima said that "Instead of just keeping Goofy one-dimensional as he's been in the past, we wanted to give an emotional side that would add to the emotional arc of the story. We wanted the audience to see his feelings instead of just his antics." Magon stated that the father-son dynamic of the film was inspired by a story from Walt Disney Studios chairman Jeffrey Katzenberg in which he and his daughter—with whom he had an estranged relationship at the time—went on a road trip together, during which they bonded and their relationship considerably improved.

While the work was a Disney production, it was considered far less essential than the studio's mainstream works at the time such as The Lion King, and was given a far smaller budget compared to these films. Thus, A Goofy Movie was jointly produced by Walt Disney Feature Animation, Walt Disney Television Animation, and Disney MovieToons and with outsourcing to Walt Disney Animation France and Walt Disney Animation Australia, along with additional Disney animation studios in Spain and Canada. Pre-production was done at the main Feature Animation studio in Burbank, California, starting as early as mid-1993. The animation work was done at Walt Disney Animation France in Paris supervised by Paul and Gaëtan Brizzi, with additional scenes animated at Disney's studio in Sydney, Australia under the direction of Steve Moore, and clean-up work done at the main Burbank studio. Additional clean-up/animation was done by Phoenix Animation Studios in Canada, and digitally inked-and-painted by the Pixibox studio in France. The film's planned release on Thanksgiving 1994 was delayed due to the monitor that they were using to capture the film's animation having a single dead pixel, forcing them to recapture three-quarters of the film again with a non-defective monitor.

Most of the main voice cast from Goof Troop reprised their roles in A Goofy Movie, including Bill Farmer as Goofy, Jim Cummings as Pete, and Rob Paulsen as PJ. To conform to his difference in age, Max was played by Jason Marsden, who was in high school at the time, replacing Dana Hill from Goof Troop as the character's voice actor. Alternatively, Aaron Lohr did Max's singing voice. Other cast members included Kellie Martin as Roxanne, Jenna von Oÿ as Stacey, and Pauly Shore as Bobby Zimuruski. Farmer, who spent 43 days recording dialogue over the span of two-and-a-half years, was initially asked by Jeffrey Katzenberg to give Goofy a regular speaking voice as opposed to the character's signature, cartoonish voice, much to the confusion of Farmer, who insisted that audiences wanted to hear the Goofy they were all familiar with. After recording lines in this manner for a week-and-a-half, according to Farmer, Michael Eisner and Roy E. Disney told Farmer to speak in Goofy's original voice, after which the dialogue was rerecorded as such. Farmer stated that he used a "mental image" of his five-year-old son at the time in order to fully embrace his role as a loving father. Magon named Principal Mazur after his own high-school principal. The character of Powerline was heavily inspired by real-life pop stars, including Michael Jackson, Prince, and Bobby Brown. R&B artist Tevin Campbell provided the singing voice for Powerline, recording the songs "Stand Out" and "I 2 I". Campbell recorded the songs in front of a green screen while performing his own choreography. The film is dedicated to Pat Buttram, who voiced the emcee at possum park, as he died after finishing his voice work for the film.

Music

The score for A Goofy Movie was provided by Carter Burwell. Burwell was the primary composer; after he had recorded his score with Shirley Walker orchestrating and conducting, Don Davis was hired to rework his score rather than write a completely new one. Burwell later wrote: "My score had relied somewhat on unusual instrumentation – banjo, percussion and choir for example – and Disney wanted the sweeping scale and familiar affect of symphonic score". Davis is credited with "additional music" on the movie and the soundtrack album. The songs "I 2 I" and "Stand Out" were performed by R&B singer Tevin Campbell, while "After Today", "On the Open Road", and "Nobody Else But You" were performed by Bill Farmer and Aaron Lohr. The soundtrack album for A Goofy Movie was released by Walt Disney Records on March 18, 1995. Mitchel Musso covered the song "Stand Out" for the DisneyMania 7 album, which was released on March 9, 2010.

Songs
Original songs performed in the film include:

Release

Theatrical
Within Disney, prior to A Goofy Movies release, the film was frequently associated with Katzenberg, and by April 1995, Katzenberg had been let go by Disney's CEO Michael Eisner due to tensions between them, and the company saw the release of A Goofy Movie as simply fulfilling contractual obligations. A Goofy Movie was originally scheduled to be released in theaters on November 18, 1994, but production setbacks resulted in a push-back to April 1995, while The Lion King was reissued to fill in for the film's absence. The film's world premiere took place on April 5, 1995, at the AMC Pleasure Island at Walt Disney World Resort in Lake Buena Vista, and was attended by director Kevin Lima and voice stars Bill Farmer and Jenna von Oÿ; two days later, it was released nationwide. The film played a limited engagement at the El Capitan Theatre from August 25 through September 4, 2017.

Home media
The film was first released on VHS and LaserDisc by Walt Disney Home Video in the United States and Canada on September 6, 1995. The American VHS release included a music video for the Parachute Express song Doctor Looney's Remedy on their video, Come Sing with Us. In the United Kingdom, it was released in theaters on October 18, 1996 (with the Mickey Mouse short Runaway Brain preceding it), and on VHS in 1997. It was reissued on June 20, 2000, along with a DVD version, as part of the Walt Disney Gold Classic Collection series. The DVD edition includes the Goof Troop episode "Calling All Goofs", the episode "The Goofy Success Story" from the Disneyland television series, and a "Disney-fied" edit of Lou Bega's 1999 song "Mambo No. 5." To date, this film and Doug's 1st Movie are the only two Disney animated films produced in widescreen that have pan and scan-only Region 1 DVD releases. The movie was released on Blu-ray as a Disney Movie Club exclusive alongside An Extremely Goofy Movie on April 23, 2019.

Reception

Box office
A Goofy Movie opened in 2,159 theaters at second place on its opening weekend with $6.1 million—held from the number one spot because of the Will Smith blockbuster Bad Boys that opened the same weekend, with $15.5 million in box office returns. It ultimately ended its run at the US box office grossing $35.3 million. Internationally it grossed $2.3 million, partially due to the fact the film was not released theatrically in most overseas territories, for a worldwide total of $37.6 million.

Critical response
On the review aggregator website Rotten Tomatoes, A Goofy Movie holds an approval rating of 61% with an average rating of 6.3/10 based on 28 critics. The website's critical consensus reads, "A Goofy Movie offers enough of its titular ingredient to satisfy younger viewers, even if most parents will agree that this beloved character deserves better". On Metacritic, the movie has a score of 53 based on 17 reviews, indicating "mixed or average reviews".

Contemporary

In contemporaneous reviews, the film received mixed responses from critics. Roger Ebert gave the film three stars out of four, noting that he only got to see a portion of the film in his initial viewing before a technical problem in the projection booth ended the screening early (somewhere between 35 and 40 minutes into the film, based on information given in his review — much less than the approximate hour he believed he'd seen). In his one-star review from The Austin Chronicle, Louis Black said "The movie appears to have forgotten that [...] it is an adolescent angst drama about his son Max's ambivalent feelings about having Goofy as a dad. This is a story about a boy and a dad [...] it is bland, a barely television-length cartoon stretched out to fill a feature, and not much fun." Writing for the San Francisco Chronicle, Peter Stack summarized it as "brutal", and said that "there's no denying that A Goofy Movie can't be a proud moment for Walt Disney Pictures." While the Los Angeles Times questioned the overall tone of the film, Empire'''s Bob McCabe gave the movie three stars out of five and the following verdict: "Harmless enough day in the sun for Goofy; pity there's an overwhelming feeling throughout that he deserves better."

From The New York Times, Stephen Holden called the film's story "too rambling and emotionally diffuse for the title character to come fully alive." Writing for Variety, Todd McCarthy criticized the film's score, and felt that the personality of Goofy's character, while agreeable enough in support, proved a bit over the top for a headliner, and that "by any reasonable reckoning, he's distinctly overbearing and selfish, and responds with a bland dismissal to any opinion offered up by his son".

Retrospective
Since its release, A Goofy Movie has undergone critical reevaluation and is now appreciated as a "true cult classic". In a 2020 editorial for Rotten Tomatoes, Rafael Matomayor wrote: "Featuring a small-scale story that kids can see themselves in, an excellent portrayal of teenage life and father-son relationships, and, crucially, a soundtrack filled with earworms to rival the work of Rice and Menken, the movie has something for everyone." Nell Minow of Common Sense Media praised the low-key tone and humor of the film, concluding: "Even tweens will enjoy this road trip with Goofy." The Mary Sue’s Princess Weekes cited the soundtrack and story as to why the film "remains a perfect father/son film".

Accolades
The film was nominated for "Best Animated Feature" in the production categories and "Best Production Design", "Best Storyboarding", "Best Music", and "Best Animation" in the individual categories at the 23rd Annie Awards.

Legacy
After its underwhelming box office performance during its theatrical release, A Goofy Movie started to gain success in 1995 to home media sales, and soon gained a cult following. The interest in the film is attributed to a combination of the film's catchy soundtrack as well as its story of cross-generational connections between parents and children. The newfound interest led to waves of new merchandise based on the film to be sold at major retailers. 

On August 14, 2015, a 20th-anniversary reunion for the film was held at the D23 Expo at Anaheim Convention Center in Anaheim, California. Those in attendance included Bill Farmer, Jason Marsden, Jim Cummings, Rob Paulsen, Jenna von Oÿ and producer Don Hahn. Wallace Shawn, Pauly Shore and director Kevin Lima also sent video messages. The panel also included musical performances from Farmer, Marsden, and Tevin Campbell. While the panel was not expected to be one of the largest panels at D23, it ended up with the largest attended, with around 1,000 fans attending, and forcing the expo to turn away some due to lack of seating.

In the video game Disney Magic Kingdoms, Pete, who appears as character, makes some references to the film, wearing the same clothes and owning the same recreational vehicle with which he goes camping.

In 2016, Campbell uploaded a video of him partaking in a jam session with the band Enfield, in which he performed both "I 2 I" and "Stand Out". In June 2018, a one-week event titled "Disney FanDaze" was opened in Disneyland Paris, featuring several dedicated performances paying tribute to Disney franchises. Among these was "Max Live! Gettin' Goofy With It", which featured Max Goof performing songs from A Goofy Movie. In April 2019, singer Uché performed "I 2 I" during the Top 10 Disney Night of American Idols seventeenth season. According to co-producer Frank Angones, the film was a strong influence during early development of the 2017 DuckTales series, particularly on its version of Donald Duck, as the creators "wanted [the] show to do for Donald what Goofy Movie did for Goofy". The series itself featured several references to the film, including the appearances of the song "Stand Out", Lester's Possum Park, and pictures of Goofy, Max, and Roxanne. In October 2021, Cody Rigsby and Cheryl Burke danced a Jive to "Stand Out" during night one of Disney Week on the 30th season of Dancing with the Stars. During an interview with i-D for Paul Thomas Anderson's film Licorice Pizza, lead actress Alana Haim called A Goofy Movie her favorite movie of all time, stating “If you haven't seen it, you need to watch A Goofy Movie. It's the best movie of all time.” 

The visual design of a scene in A Goofy Movie where Goofy and Pete have a conversation in a hot tub was cited as an inspiration for a similar scene in the season 2 episode of Gravity Falls "Roadside Attraction" in the episode's DVD commentary.

In 2022, Pixar director Domee Shi said she was inspired by A Goofy Movie for the story of her directorial debut, Turning Red (2022).

The eighth episode of Atlanta’s fourth season, titled "The Goof Who Sat By the Door" , was a mockumentary about the making of the film.

Sequel
A direct-to-video sequel to A Goofy Movie, titled An Extremely Goofy Movie, was released on DVD and VHS in 2000 and serves as the finale to the Goof Troop'' series as a whole. Characters that returned for the sequel were Goofy, Max, P.J., Pete, and Bobby, but Roxanne is absent from the sequel and is not referenced. In it, Goofy loses his job and enrolls in the college which Max recently started attending, while Max and his friends participate in the X Games, unaware of the reason why the school's top fraternity has a dynasty in the competition.

Notes

References

External links

 
 
 
 

1995 films
1995 animated films
1995 comedy films
1995 directorial debut films
1990s adventure comedy films
1990s American animated films
1990s buddy comedy films
1990s children's animated films
1990s comedy road movies
1990s coming-of-age comedy films
1990s musical comedy films
1990s English-language films
1990s high school films
American adventure films
American adventure comedy films
American buddy comedy films
American children's animated adventure films
American children's animated comedy films
American children's animated musical films
American comedy road movies
American coming-of-age comedy films
American high school films
American musical comedy films
Animated buddy films
Animated coming-of-age films
Animated films about dogs
Animated films based on animated series
Animated teen films
Bigfoot films
DisneyToon Studios animated films
Disney Television Animation films
Films about father–son relationships
Films about dysfunctional families
Films about vacationing
Films directed by Kevin Lima
Films scored by Carter Burwell
Animated films set in Los Angeles
Films set in Ohio
Films with screenplays by Jymn Magon
Films with screenplays by Chris Matheson (screenwriter)
Goof Troop
Goofy (Disney) films